Anđelko Jovanović (born 18 November 1999) is a Montenegrin footballer who plays as a midfielder for Podgorica and the Montenegro national team.

Career
Jovanović made his international debut for Montenegro on 11 November 2020 in a friendly match against Kazakhstan.

Career statistics

International

References

External links
 
 

1999 births
Living people
Montenegrin footballers
Montenegro international footballers
Association football midfielders
FK Dečić players
FK Podgorica players
Montenegrin First League players
Montenegrin Second League players